An industrial design right is an intellectual property right that protects the visual design of objects that are purely utilitarian.  An industrial design consists of the creation of a shape, configuration or composition of pattern or color, or combination of pattern and color in three-dimensional form containing aesthetic value.  An industrial design can be a two- or three-dimensional pattern used to produce a product, industrial commodity or handicraft.

Under the Hague Agreement Concerning the International Deposit of Industrial Designs, a WIPO-administered treaty, a procedure for an international registration exists. To qualify for registration, the national laws of most member states of WIPO require the design to be novel. An applicant can file for a single international deposit with WIPO or with the national office in a country party to the treaty. The design will then be protected in as many member countries of the treaty as desired.  Design rights started in the United Kingdom in 1787 with the Designing and Printing of Linen Act and have expanded from there.

Registering for an industrial design right is related to granting a patent.

Law making

Kenya 
According to industrial property Act 2001, an industrial design is defined as "any composition of lines or colours or any three-dimensional form whether or not associated with lines or colours, provided that such composition or form gives a special appearance to a product of industry or handicraft and can serve as pattern for a product of industry or handicraft" .

An industrial design is registrable if it is new. An industrial design is deemed to be new if it has not been disclosed to the public, anywhere in the world, by publication in tangible form or, in Kenya by use or in any other way, prior to the filing date or, where applicable, the priority date of the application for registration. However a disclosure of the industrial design is not taken into consideration if it occurred not earlier than twelve months before the filing date or, where applicable, the priority date of the application and if it was by reason or in consequence of acts committed by the applicant or his predecessor in title; or an evident abuse committed by a third party in relation to the applicant or his predecessor in title.

India 
India's Design Act, 2000 was enacted to consolidate and amend the law relating to protection of design and to comply with the articles 25 and 26 of Trade-Related Aspects of Intellectual Property Rights TRIPS agreement. The new act, (earlier Patent and Design Act, 1911 was repealed by this act) now defines "design" to mean only the features of shape, configuration, pattern, ornament, or composition of lines or colours applied to any article, whether in two- or three-dimensional, or in both forms, by any industrial process or means, whether manual or mechanical or chemical, separate or combined, which in the finished article appeal to and are judged solely by the eye; but does not include any mode or principle of construction.

Indonesia 
In Indonesia the protection of the Right to Industrial Design shall be granted for 10 (ten) years commencing from the filing date and there is not any renewal or annuity after the given period.

 Industrial Designs that are Granted Protection
1. The Right to Industrial Design shall be granted for an Industrial Design that is novel/new
2. An Industrial Design shall be deemed new if on the filing date, such Industrial Design is not the same as any previous disclosure.
3. The previous disclosure as referred to in point 2 shall be one which before :
a. The filing date or 
b. The Priority Date, if the applicant is filed with priority right.
c. Has been announced or used in Indonesia or outside Indonesia.
 
An industrial design shall not be deemed to have been announced if within the period of 6 (six) months at the latest before the filing date, such industrial design 
a. Has been displayed in a national or international exhibition in Indonesia or overseas that is official or deemed to be official; or,
b. Has been used in Indonesia by the designer in an experiment for the purposes of education, research or development.

Canada 
Canadian law affords ten years of protection to industrial designs that are registered; there is no protection for unregistered designs.  The Industrial Design Act defines "design" or "industrial design" to mean "features of shape, configuration, pattern or ornament and any combination of those features that, in a finished article, appeal to and are judged solely by the eye." The design must also be original: in 2012, the Patent Appeal Board rejected a design for a trash can, and gave guidance as to what the Act requires:

 The degree of originality required to register an original design is greater than that laid down by Canadian copyright legislation, but less than that required to register a patent.
 The articles being compared should not be examined side by side, but separate so that imperfect recollection comes into play.
 One is to look at the design as a whole.
 Any change must be substantial. It must not be trivial or infinitesimal.

During the existence of an exclusive right, no person can "make, import for the purpose of trade or business, or sell, rent, or offer or expose for sale or rent, any article in respect of which the design is registered." The rule also applies to kits and substantial differences are in reference to previously published designs.

Registering an industrial design in Canada may be appropriate for a variety of articles such as consumer products, vehicles, sports equipment, packaging, etc., having an original aesthetic appearance, and may even be used to protect new technologies such as electronic icons. Industrial designs can also serve to complement other forms of intellectual property rights such as patents and trade-marks.

The Canadian courts see infrequent litigation concerning industrial designs  the first case in almost two decades took place in 2012 between Bodum and Trudeau Corporation concerning visual features of double wall drinking glasses.

It is possible for a registered design to also receive protection under Canadian copyright or trademark law:

 a "useful article" (ie, one with a utilitarian function) will receive copyright protection where it is reproduced in a quantity of fifty or less, but that limitation does not apply with respect to:
 a graphic or photographic representation that is applied to the face of an article
 a trade-mark or a representation thereof or a label
 material that has a woven or knitted pattern or that is suitable for piece goods or surface coverings or for making wearing apparel
 a representation of a real or fictitious being, event or place that is applied to an article as a feature of shape, configuration, pattern or ornament
 where a registered design has become publicly identifiable with the product, it may be eligible for registration as a "distinguishing guise" under trademark law, but such registration cannot be used to limit the development of any art or industry

European Union

Registered and unregistered community designs are available which provide a unitary right covering the European Community. Protection for a registered community design is for up to 25 years, subject to the payment of renewal fees every five years. The unregistered community design lasts for three years after a design is made available to the public and infringement only occurs if the protected design has been copied.

United Kingdom

Legislation given in Britain during the years 1787 to 1839 protected designs for textiles. The Copyright of Design Act passed in 1842 allowed other material designs, such as those for metal and earthenware objects, to be registered with a diamond mark to indicate the date of registration.

In addition to the design protection available under community designs, UK law provides its own national registered design right (Registered Designs Act 1949, later amended by Copyright, Designs and Patents Act 1988) and an unregistered design right. The unregistered right, which exists automatically if the requirements are met, can last for up to 15 years. The registered design right can last up to 25 years subject to the payment of maintenance fees. The topography of semi-conductor circuits are also covered by integrated circuit layout design protection, a form of protection which lasts 10 years.

Japan

Article 1 of the Japanese Design Law states: "This law was designed to protect and utilize designs and to encourage creation of designs in order to contribute to industrial development".  The protection period in Japan is 20 years from the day of registration.

United States
U.S. design patents last fifteen years from the date of grant if filed on or after May 13, 2015 (fourteen years if filed before May 13, 2015) and cover the ornamental aspects of utilitarian objects. Objects that lack a use beyond that conferred by their appearance or the information they convey, may be covered by copyright—a form of intellectual property of much longer duration that exists as soon as a qualifying work is created. In some circumstances, rights may also be acquired in trade dress, but trade dress protection is akin to trademark rights and requires that the design have source significance or "secondary meaning." It is useful only to prevent source misrepresentations; trade dress protection.

Australia 
In Australia, design patent registration lasts for 5 years, with an option to be extended once for an additional 5 years. For the patent to be granted, a formalities exam is needed. If infringement action is to be taken, the design needs to become certified which involves a substantive examination.

Duration of design rights
Depending on the jurisdiction registered design rights have a duration between 15 and 50 years. Members of the WIPO Hague system have to publish their maximum term of protection for design rights. These terms are presented in the table below. Some of the jurisdiction below are unions or collaborative office for design registration like the African Intellectual Property Organization, the European Union and the Benelux.

Bibliography

 Brian W. Gray & Effie Bouzalas, editors, Industrial Design Rights: An International Perspective (Kluwer Law International: The Hague, 2001)

See also 
 Design patent (US patent law)
 Geschmacksmuster (German design law)
 Industrial design rights in the European Union
 Open-design movement
 Utility model

References

External links 
 Information about industrial design rights on the Kenya Industrial Property Institute website.
 Information about industrial design rights on the IPAustralia website.
 Information about industrial design rights on the UK Patent Office web site
 International Designs on the WIPO web site
 Hague System for the International Registration of Industrial Designs on the WIPO web site
 www.handsoffmydesign.com e-Learning about European Union Design Protection
 Ebook on legal protection * [http://www.thehagueuniversity.com/ www.thehagueuniversity.com Industrial Design Engineering (IDE) – full time]   of textile designs

Intellectual property law